KGOF-LD (channel 33) is a low-powered television station in Fresno, California, United States. It is owned by Cocola Broadcasting.

History
The station was noted for its commitment to local programming. Originally broadcasting on channel 34, the then-KSDI-LP invited individuals and organizations to produce their own television programs. Similar to many public-access cable television networks, many locals became a part of the programming on KSDI-LP.

The station was formerly an affiliate of Urban America Television and Shop at Home. The previous affiliation, Shop At Home, was temporary, due to the Shop At Home network ceasing broadcasting on June 21, 2006. The network it replaced, Urban America Television, folded a month earlier.

Subchannels
The station's digital signal is multiplexed:

Previous logo

References

External links
Cocola Broadcasting official site
Central Valley Talk
Fresno Forward

GOF-LD
Television channels and stations established in 1987
1987 establishments in California